Chemokine (C-C motif) ligand 12 (CCL12) is a small cytokine belonging to the CC chemokine family that has been described in mice.  It is also known as monocyte chemotactic protein 5 (MCP-5) and, due to its similarity with the human chemokine MCP-1, sometimes it is called MCP-1-related chemokine.  CCL12 specifically attracts eosinophils, monocytes and lymphocytes. This chemokine is found predominantly in lymph nodes and thymus under normal conditions, and its expression can be hugely induced in macrophages. It is thought to coordinate cell movements during early allergic reactions, and immune response to pathogens.  The gene for CCL12 is found in a cluster of CC chemokines on mouse chromosome 11.

References

Cytokines